The Forth Canoe Club, founded in 1934, is Scotland's oldest surviving canoe club.  It is a founding member of the Scottish Canoe Association.

The club originally met at Granton in North Edinburgh on the Firth of Forth. In 1982 it moved to Lochrin Basin at the Edinburgh end of the Union Canal following an extensive dredging operation by the club's second commodore Kelso Riddell.

When the Union Canal was developed by British Waterways as part of the Millennium Link, Forth Canoe Club were required to relocate and in 2004 moved to the Old St Andrew's Boathouse further along the canal adjacent to Harrison Park.

The first commodore was Jack Cuthill and the main building of the club was named after him. When this building was destroyed, the new building at Grandtully was named in his memory.

The club's motto,  means "by wind and by skill".

Forth Canoe Club member David Florence represented Great Britain at the 2008 Summer Olympics as a member of the senior team.  At the 2008 Summer Olympics in Beijing he won a silver medal in the men's C1 single slalom event on 12 August 2008.

References

External links 
 
 Beijing Olympics website, entry on David Florence 
 Website on David Florence
 "Canoe club is on course for great things", Edinburgh Evening News, 15 May 2008

Canoe clubs in the United Kingdom
Sports organisations of Scotland
Sports organizations established in 1934
1934 establishments in Scotland
Canoeing in Scotland
Sports teams in Edinburgh